Mariana Treviño Ortiz (born 21 November 1977) is a Mexican stage and screen actress from Monterrey. She became known to a wider domestic audience through her role as Lupita in the popular jukebox musical Mentiras, which she played in over a thousand performances. Following the success of Mentiras, Treviño went on to appear in Mexican comedy films such as No sé si cortarme las venas o dejármelas largas (2013) and Amor de Mis Amores (2014).

Career
As of 2015, she co-stars with Luis Gerardo Méndez in Netflix's first ever Spanish-language original production Club de Cuervos.

Treviño co-stars with Tom Hanks in Sony Pictures' A Man Called Otto. Director Marc Forster noted that he was "blown away" by her audition tape, which was recorded on her phone from a hotel room in Spain.

Partial filmography
Cuestión de Corbatas (2012) - Natalia
Alguien más (2013) - Katy
Tercera Llamada (2013) - Ceci "La Asistonta"
No sé si cortarme las venas o dejármelas largas (2013) - Carmela
Amor de Mis Amores (2014) - Shaila
Club de Cuervos (2015) - Isabel Iglesias
Una Ultima y Nos Vamos (2015) - Hilda
Sabrás Qué Hacer Conmigo (2016)
El Sueño del Mara'akame (2016)
La vida inmoral de la pareja ideal (2016)
Como Cortar a tu Patán (2017) - Amanda
Overboard (2018) - Sofia
Eres mi pasión (2018) - Luli
Perfect Strangers (2018) - Flora
La liga de los 5 (2019)
The House of Flowers (2019–2020) - Jenny Quetzal
Narcos Mexico  (2020)
100 Days to fall in love  (2020)
A Man Called Otto (2022) - Marisol

Theatre credits
Mentiras, el musical - Lupita

Accolades
Treviño received two nominations at the 59th Ariel Awards, for Best Supporting Actress for La vida inmoral de la pareja ideal (Tales Of An Immoral Couple), and Best Actress in a Minor Role for El Sueño del Mara'akame (Mara'akame's Dream).

References

External links 

1977 births
Living people
Mexican stage actresses
Mexican television actresses
Mexican film actresses
21st-century Mexican actresses
Actresses from Monterrey
Mexican people of Spanish-Jewish descent